Namilakonda is the name of a village in Karimnagar district in Telangana, India.

References

Villages in Karimnagar district